Serge Fontaine (born September 17, 1947) is a Canadian politician in the province of Quebec.

Background

He was born on September 17, 1947 in Villeroy, Quebec and was an attorney.

Political career

Fontaine was elected as a Union Nationale candidate to the provincial legislature in the district of Nicolet with 35% of the vote in the 1976 election.  He served as his party's Deputy House Whip in 1980 and 1981.  He finished a close third with 32% of the vote against Parti Québécois candidate Yves Beaumier and lost in the 1981 election.

Fontaine helped found the modern version of the Conservative Party of Quebec and served for a time as its leader. In November 2011, he resigned and joined the Coalition Avenir Québec.

References

1947 births
Living people
Union Nationale (Quebec) MNAs
People from Centre-du-Québec